This article contains the results of the Republic of Ireland women's national football team between 2000 and 2009. During the 2000s the Republic of Ireland competed in three UEFA Women's Championship qualification campaigns – 2001, 2005 and 2009 – and three FIFA Women's World Cup campaigns – 2003, 2007 and 2011. They also played in the 2003, 2006, 2007 and 2008 Algarve Cups.  The Republic of Ireland also went on three tours of the United States – 2004, 2006 and 2008. During the decade the Republic of Ireland also enjoyed some minor successes. In 2000 they won the Celt Cup – a four team tournament that also featured Northern Ireland, Scotland and the Isle of Man. In their 2005 UEFA Women's Euro campaign they also won their second level group, finishing above Romania, Croatia, Bosnia and Herzegovina and Malta. This effectively saw them promoted to the elite group of nations which competed directly for qualification to major tournaments.

2000

2001

2002

2003

2004

2005

2006

2007

2008

2009

Notes

References

2000-09
1999–2000 in Republic of Ireland association football
2000–01 in Republic of Ireland association football
2001–02 in Republic of Ireland association football
2002–03 in Republic of Ireland association football
2003 in Republic of Ireland women's association football
2004 in Republic of Ireland women's association football
2005 in Republic of Ireland women's association football
2006 in Republic of Ireland women's association football
2007 in Republic of Ireland women's association football
2008 in Republic of Ireland women's association football
2009 in Republic of Ireland women's association football